Maem is a village located in the North Goa district in the state of Goa, India. In 2001, the population was 7544 of which 3799 were male and 3745 were female.

Government and politics
Maem is part of Maem (Goa Assembly constituency) and North Goa (Lok Sabha constituency).

References

Cities and towns in North Goa district